Dreamin' Out Loud is the debut studio album of American country music artist Trace Adkins. The album was released in 1996, and it features the singles "There's a Girl in Texas", "Every Light in the House", "(This Ain't) No Thinkin' Thing" and "I Left Something Turned On at Home", which peaked at No. 20, No. 3, No. 1, and No. 2, respectively. The album was certified platinum by the Recording Industry Association of America for U.S. shipments of one million copies.

Critical reception
Thom Owens of Allmusic gave the album four stars out of five, commending Adkins' "powerhouse" voice and citing "There's a Girl in Texas" as one of the strongest-written songs on the album. His review criticized the production as being too polished.

Track listing

Personnel
Trace Adkins - acoustic guitar, lead vocals
Eddie Bayers - drums
Barry Beckett - organ
Bill Cuomo - synthesizer
Paul Franklin - steel guitar
Rob Hajacos - fiddle
Brent Mason - electric guitar
Terry McMillan - harmonica
Matt Rollings - piano
Michael Spriggs - acoustic guitar
Dennis Wilson - background vocals
Glenn Worf - bass guitar
Curtis "Mr. Harmony" Young - background vocals

Charts

Weekly charts

Year-end charts

Singles

Certifications

References

1996 debut albums
Trace Adkins albums
Capitol Records albums
Albums produced by Scott Hendricks